Carbondale is a city in Lackawanna County, Pennsylvania, United States. Carbondale is located approximately 15 miles due northeast of the city of Scranton in Northeastern Pennsylvania. The population was 8,828 at the 2020 census.

The land area that became Carbondale was developed by William and Maurice Wurts, the founders of the Delaware and Hudson Canal Company, during the rise of the anthracite coal mining industry in the early 19th century. It was also a major terminal of the Delaware and Hudson Railroad. Carbondale was the site of the first deep vein anthracite coal mine in the United States, and was the site of the Carbondale mine fire which burned from 1946 to the early 1970s.

Like many other cities and towns in the region, Carbondale has struggled with the demise of the once-prominent coal mining industry that had once made the region a haven for immigrants seeking work so many decades ago. Immigrants from Wales, England, Scotland, Ireland, Italy and from throughout continental Europe came to Carbondale in the course of the nineteenth and early-twentieth centuries to work in the anthracite and railroading industries.

Geography

Demographics

As of the 2020 United States census, there were 8,828 people and 3,905 households residing in the city. The population density was 2,758.8 people per square mile (1,063.6/km). There were 4,214 housing units at an average density of 1,317 per square mile (507.7/km). The racial makeup of the city was 87.8% White, 2.2% African American, 0.3% Native American, 0.5% Asian, 3.0% from other races, and 6.2% from two or more races. Hispanic or Latino of any race were 7.2% of the population.

There were 3,905 households, out of which 19.3% had children under the age of 18 living with them, 19.2% had a male householder with no spouse present, 38.4% had a female householder with no spouse present. The average family size was 2.65.

In the city, the population was spread out, with 19.3% under the age of 18, 57% from 18 to 64, and 23.7% who were 65 years of age or older. The median age was 44.2 years.

The median income for a household in the city was $42,618, and the median income for a family was $55,043. About 24.8% of the population were below the poverty threshold, including 46.7% of those under age 18 and 15.7% of those age 65 or over.

History
The Carbondale Historical Society and Museum records and maintains the city's history.  The Carbondale City Hall and Courthouse was added to the National Register of Historic Places in 1983. The Delaware and Hudson Canal Gravity Railroad Shops have been demolished, but were once listed on the National Register of Historic Places.

The Carbondale mine fire began in Carbondale in 1946. Every census since 1940 has seen a steady decline in the population of Carbondale, mostly attributed to the end of the coal industry in the area.

Notable "firsts"
 1829: the Delaware and Hudson Gravity Railroad from Carbondale to Honesdale began operations on October 9, 1829. This was the first commercially successful railroad to operate in America.
 1833: the first Saint Patrick's Day parade in what is now Lackawanna County is held in Carbondale, as stated in the Scranton Times-Tribune: "It comes as no surprise that the Irish people of Carbondale would want to celebrate the patron saint of their homeland. ... The Feb. 28, 1833, issue of the Northern Pennsylvanian, the first newspaper published in Carbondale, contained a notice to “Hibernians” of a public meeting to be held ... ‘for the purpose of taking measures to celebrate St. Patrick’s Day.’ ... The Carbondale parade is the first one mentioned in any history of the region that is now Lackawanna County."
 1850: the first eisteddfod (a Welsh musical and literary festival) in America was held in Carbondale on Christmas Day, 1850. Among the literarians and musicians who attended were Daniel Davies, the Rev. John Moses, Thomas Eynon, the Rev. Thomas J. Phillips, and Edward Jones. These were the pioneer eisteddofdwyr of America.
 1851: Carbondale was incorporated as a city in Luzerne County on March 15, 1851, making it the oldest city (the "Pioneer" city) in what later became Lackawanna County, and the fourth oldest city in the Commonwealth of Pennsylvania
 1853: the first lodge in America of the ancient Welsh Philanthropic Order of True Ivorites was opened in Carbondale in the fall of 1853; the first public Ivorite celebration in America took place in Carbondale in August 1855, when a procession and other public exercises took place, under the direction of Thomas Voyle, Esquire, chief marshal, and Edward Roberts, Esquire.

Notable people
James Archbald, born 1793, Little Cumbrae island, Ayrshire Coast, Scotland, first mayor of Carbondale
Patrick De Lacey, born 1835, earned  Medal of Honor during American Civil War Battle of the Wilderness
William J. Goebel, Democratic politician and 34th Governor of Kentucky serving for three days in 1900 before his death; he was the only sitting Governor to have been assassinated
Robert Wood Johnson I, entrepreneur and industrialist who founded the company Johnson & Johnson
General Jerome F. O'Malley, U.S. Air Force four-star general
Terry Pegula, owner of the Buffalo Bills NFL team, Buffalo Sabres NHL team and Rochester Americans AHL team; also a natural gas businessman
Terence V. Powderly, a well-known national figure as leader of the Knights of Labor from 1879 to 1893; twice elected Mayor of Scranton, PA.
Joseph R. Sarnoski, Medal of Honor recipient (World War II)
Andy Seigle, professional basketball player for the Philippine Basketball Association; though born in Scranton, is a Carbondale native and the all-time leading scorer at Carbondale Area High School; played for the University of New Orleans
Danny Seigle, professional basketball player for the San Miguel Beermen of the Philippine Basketball Association; a standout at Wagner College, he led Carbondale Area High School Chargers to 108–5 record in four years and Pennsylvania Interscholastic Athletic Association Class AA Championship in 1993
William Henry Stanton (1843-1900), U.S. Congressman for Pennsylvania's 12th congressional district
George D. Stoddard, born in 1897, president of the University of Illinois and University of the State of New York; chancellor of New York University and Long Island University
Ed Wade, born 1956, Major League Baseball executive who served as vice president and general manager of the Philadelphia Phillies, 1998–2005 and Houston Astros, 2008–2011;   credited with putting together Phillies' core nucleus that led to 2008 World Series championship

Transportation

Highway
U.S. Business Route 6 runs down Main Street, Carbondale, as the main highway through the city. Recently completed after years of highly visible construction, the four-lane Robert P. Casey Memorial Highway U.S. Route 6 runs from Interstate 81 near Scranton north past Carbondale with interchanges outside, but close to, the city limits.

Rail
As the city responsible for the importation of America's first steam locomotive, the Stourbridge Lion in 1829, Carbondale was once a main terminus of the Delaware and Hudson Railway. It was also served by the Erie Railroad and the New York, Ontario and Western Railway.

Today Carbondale is served by the Pennsylvania Northeast Regional Railroad Authority and its designated-operator Delaware-Lackawanna Railroad on a single remaining D&H mainline track running to Scranton, now called the Carbondale Mainline.

Steamtown National Historic Site on occasion provides excursion trains originating from the Scranton Yard to the Carbondale Station for special events.

Bus
Carbondale is served by the County of Lackawanna Transit System (COLTS).

Local transportation
Carbondale is served by the #52 and #82 lines, run by COLTS bus.

Media
WCDL-AM 1440 has served the area since 1950. Co-owned WTRW broadcasts on 94.5 FM.

In popular culture
 Carbondale holds an annual festival every summer called Pioneer Days, in honor of Carbondale's nickname, The Pioneer City.  The festival features local bands, arts and crafts, carnival games, festival food, and a fireworks display.
 Annual Saint David's Day Dinner, March 1: hosted by the Historical Society to commemorate the Welsh roots of the City of Carbondale and to celebrate the Welsh heritage of a great many residents of the Lackawanna and Wyoming Valleys in Pennsylvania.
 Annual Crystal Band Christmas Concert takes place on the first Sunday in December, hosted by the Historical Society and the Berean Baptist Church. The Crystal Band, founded in the Petersburg section of Scranton in 1887, is an all-volunteer concert band that is made up of residents from throughout northeastern Pennsylvania.
 The 2010 film "Blue Valentine" was filmed, in part, in Carbondale.

See also
Hendrick Manufacturing Company

References

 
Cities in Pennsylvania
Populated places established in 1824
Municipalities of the Anthracite Coal Region of Pennsylvania
Cities in Lackawanna County, Pennsylvania
Lackawanna Heritage Valley
Coal towns in Pennsylvania